Assassin's Quest is a 1997 fantasy novel by American writer Robin Hobb, the third and final book in The Farseer Trilogy. It follows the exploits of FitzChivalry Farseer. While Fitz's narrative continues in The Tawny Man Trilogy, the Liveship Traders Trilogy is next in the chronology of the Realm of the Elderlings.

Plot summary

FitzChivalry Farseer has been raised from death, but spends months with the mind of a wolf after his time sharing minds with Nighteyes. He lives in a remote cabin watched by Burrich and Chade, the only ones who know he is alive. Fitz gradually regains his humanity but struggles with the loss of his former life and the trauma of his torture in King Regal's dungeons. Fitz decides only a personal quest to kill Regal will bring him peace. Before departing the cabin, Fitz is attacked by and kills Forged Ones. Through his uncontrollable Skill dreams, Fitz later learns that Burrich found the scene and believes him dead. Burrich is caring for Molly, Fitz's former lover who is now pregnant with his child. Meanwhile, Lady Patience leads Buckkeep's remaining resistance against the Red Ship Raiders.

Fitz travels to Regal's palace in Tradeford but fails to assassinate him thanks to the remaining coterie members. Verity aids his escape and imprints the command "Come To Me" into Fitz's mind. Unable to disobey, Fitz follows the path of Verity's quest to find the Elderlings to the Mountain Kingdom. His bond with his Wit companion, Nighteyes, deepens and changes as they become more similar. The wolf begins to think abstractly and plan events as a human does. Fitz meets other Witted people who call themselves "Old Blood," but declines to learn more of their ways.

Fitz and Nighteyes are joined by Starling, a minstrel, and Kettle, an old woman who is seeking the White Prophet. They evade Regal's men to reach the Mountain Kingdom. Fitz is tended back to health by the White Prophet, revealed to be the Fool. The Fool has prophesied that Fitz is a Catalyst who is essential to the future of the Six Duchies. Verity and Kettricken's child was stillborn. Kettricken and Chade decide to take Fitz and Molly's daughter to become the Farseer heir, despite Fitz's pleas that he be allowed a simple life with them.

As Regal attempts to conquer the Mountain Kingdom, Fitz, Kettricken, the Fool, and Starling set off to find Verity, followed by Kettle, who is mysteriously knowledgeable about the Skill. The group encounter a road leading to a ruined city, both constructed of a black stone imbued with Skill. The road is perilous for those sensitive to the Skill but without sufficient training. Fitz survives thanks to the guidance of Kettle and his bond with Nighteyes, and also develops a bond with the Fool. They discover a garden full of dragon sculptures that Fitz senses as alive with his Wit, which they realize may be the legendary Elderlings.

Beyond the garden is a quarry of Skill stone where they find Verity, frail and obsessed with carving a dragon of his own. Kettle reveals she is the last remaining member of a former royal coterie, though her Skill ability was taken from her. She reveals that the stone dragons were carved by Skilled Farseers and their coteries by Skilling their own memories and emotions into the stone, giving up their lives to animate the dragons. Fitz uses his Skill and Wit to help Verity and Kettle restore each other's Skill strength. They nearly complete the dragon, but Verity does not have enough power left. After learning that Molly and Burrich have fallen in love while caring for her daughter, Fitz offers his own life on the condition that they be left alone. Instead, Verity and Fitz's minds switch bodies, allowing Verity to share a last night with Kettricken and providing the final surge of emotion and memory needed. Verity becomes the dragon and flies with Kettricken and Starling to defend Buckkeep.

The Fool inadvertently wakes another incomplete dragon while Fitz faces Regal's men. He learns how to wake the other dragons with a combination of blood and Wit. The risen dragons defeat the soldiers and Will, and are then led by Verity-as-Dragon to defeat the Red Ship Raiders. With his coterie broken, Regal has no defense against Fitz's Skill. Instead of killing him, Fitz imprints him with fanatical loyalty to Kettricken and the Six Duchies. Regal restores Buckkeep and ensures the legitimacy of Kettricken and Verity's heir she is left pregnant with, Prince Dutiful.

After the Raiders are defeated, the dragons return to the mountains to sleep as stone again. The Fool disappears, the prophecy of the Catalyst apparently fulfilled. Fitz retires into anonymity and travels for several years. Chade and Starling are some of the few who know he still lives in isolation, attempting to write about his history.

Themes 
Assassin’s Quest has been called a coming of age story. A starred review from Publishers Weekly stated that the story holds a lesson "that the pursuit of truth demands a price in loneliness only a few can or will pay." Other reviewers have pointed to a sense of hopelessness in the narrative and how often Hobb makes use of failure.

Reception
Assassin’s Quest received positive reviews from critics. Reviewers have called the novel a fun and enjoyable read. Publishers Weekly gave the novel a starred review and commented on the "shimmering language". Kirkus Reviews called the novel "an enthralling conclusion to this superb trilogy, displaying an exceptional combination of originality, magic, adventure, character, and drama."

Editions
This edition's cover is illustrated by John Howe.
 In September 2020, Folio Society released a new illustrated hardback edition of the trilogy, with illustrations by David Palumbo.

References

External links
 
 

1997 American novels
American fantasy novels
Novels by Robin Hobb
The Farseer Trilogy
HarperCollins books